EBFC may refer to:

Eastbourne Borough F.C.
East Ballarat Football Club
East Belfast F.C.
East Bengal F.C.
Erith & Belvedere F.C.